The 2015 European Juniors Wrestling Championships was held in Istanbul, Turkey between June 23–28, 2015.

Medal table

Team ranking

Medal summary

Men's freestyle

Men's Greco-Roman

Women's freestyle

References 

Wrestling
European Wrestling Juniors Championships
Sports competitions in Istanbul
European Wrestling Juniors Championships